Champagne Gauthier is a Champagne house founded in 1858 in %C3%89pernay. 
Its Champagne is made as both vintage and non-vintage (NV) blend.

See also

 History of Champagne
 Champagne production
 Grower Champagne
 List of Champagne houses

References 

Champagne (province)
French brands
1858 establishments in France
Food and drink companies established in 1858